The Kakisa Formation is a stratigraphical unit of Frasnian age in the Western Canadian Sedimentary Basin.

It takes the name from the Kakisa River, a tributary of the Mackenzie River, and was first described in outcrop on the banks of the Trout River by H.R. Belyea and D.J. McLaren in 1962.

Lithology
The Kakisa Formation is composed of silty and dolomitic limestone.

Reef builders such as corals and stromatoporoids can be identified in the formation. It is refoid in its northern extent, where its thickness is variable.

Distribution

Relationship to other units

The Kakisa Formation is disconformably overlain by the Trout River Formation and conformably overlays the Redknife Formation (east) or the Fort Simpson Formation (west).

It is equivalent to parts of the Winterburn Group in central Alberta. Towards the west, it becomes shaley and turns into the Fort Simpson Formation.

References

Stratigraphy of British Columbia
Stratigraphy of the Northwest Territories
Devonian southern paleotropical deposits
Frasnian Stage